Lady Maisery are an English folk vocal harmony trio composed of Hannah James (vocals, piano accordion, clogs, foot percussion), Hazel Askew (vocals, melodeon, concertina, harp, bells) and Rowan Rheingans (vocals, fiddle, banjo, bansitar).

Lady Maisery sing traditional and contemporary folk songs as well as exploring the tradition of diddling or tune singing, which has nearly died out in England, but is still prevalent in Scandinavia and other parts of Europe. They released their first album, Weave & Spin in 2011, and their second, Mayday, in 2013. Their third album, Cycle, was released in October 2016

Name 

Lady Maisery's name is based on one that appears in a number of traditional folk songs, most notably the Child ballad "Lady Maisry", but also "The Laily Worm & The Machrel of The Sea" (the former of these appears on their second album, Mayday).

History 

In 2011, Lady Maisery released Weave & Spin and were subsequently nominated for the Horizon Award in the BBC Radio 2 Folk Awards, and for Best Debut in the Spiral Awards.  The album was also made 'Album of the Week' in The Independent. In 2012 they were featured on BBC Radio 4's Woman's Hour and in 2013 they have twice appeared on BBC Radio 3's classical music programme 'In Tune'.

In 2013, they released a charity download single to mark International Women’s Day on 8 March—a version of Kate Bush’s song "This Woman’s Work"--with proceeds donated to the charity coalition "End Violence Against Women". This preceded the release of their second album, Mayday, which was launched in both London and Sheffield.

During 2013, Lady Maisery also gave a number of performances of "Rest", a secular requiem, composed for them by Emily Hall and Toby Litt as the third in the pair's trilogy of song cycles. Performances included the National Portrait Gallery, London, Spitalfields Summer Festival  and Deal Festival.

All three members were part of the Songs of Separation project, which won "Best Album" in the 2017 BBC Radio 2 Folk Awards.

Discography

Albums 
 Weave & Spin (released 21 August 2011)
 Mayday (released 10 June 2013)
 Cycle (released 28 October 2016)
 Tender (released 11 November 2022)

Singles 
 "This Woman's Work" (released as a download single, 8 March 2013)

Reviews

Weave & Spin 
 Bright Young Folk
 Maverick Magazine
 Spiral Earth

Mayday 
 Bright Young Folk
 Financial Times
 Folk Witness
 For Folk's Sake
 Spiral Earth

References

External links 
 

English folk musical groups